Hurricane Celia was the costliest tropical cyclone in Texas history until Hurricane Alicia in 1983. The third named storm, second hurricane, and first major hurricane of the 1970 Atlantic hurricane season, Celia developed from a tropical wave in the western Caribbean Sea on July 31. Initially, the depression tracked north-northwestward without significantly strengthening, and crossed over western Cuba on August 1. Heavy rains on the island caused severe flooding, leading to five fatalities. The depression entered the Gulf of Mexico and was upgraded to Tropical Storm Celia later on August 1. Due to warm sea surface temperatures, Celia rapidly intensified into a major hurricane on August 1 and after the creation of the Saffir–Simpson hurricane wind scale in 1971 it was estimated to have been a Category 3 storm. Storm surge and swells lashed the west coast of Florida, especially the Panhandle, causing eight people to drown. Early on August 2, Celia began to weaken. However, the storm underwent rapid deepening again and peaked as a Category 4 hurricane with winds of 140 mph (220 km/h) on August 3.

In Louisiana, tides caused minor coastal flooding. Minor erosion damage was reported along Highway 82 in Cameron Parish. Late afternoon on August 3, Celia made landfall near Corpus Christi, Texas. Throughout the state, 8,950 homes were destroyed and damaged about 55,650 others. About 252 small businesses, 331 boats, and 310 farm buildings were either damaged or destroyed. In Corpus Christi, about one-third of houses suffered severe damage or were destroyed. Additionally, about 90% of the buildings in downtown were damaged to some degree. Celia weakened as it continued further inland and dissipated over New Mexico on August 6. Overall, this storm caused 28 deaths and $930 million (1970 USD) in damage.

Meteorological history

A tropical wave emerged into the Atlantic Ocean from the west coast of Africa in late July; a weather station in Dakar, Senegal observed a wind shift on July 23. The wave then continued moving rapidly westward across the Caribbean Sea. However, falling atmospheric pressures over the Southern United States eroded a subtropical ridge, causing the system to decelerate by July 30. Around that time, a closed circulation began to organize in the northwestern Caribbean between the Cayman Islands and Swan Island. At 0000 UTC on July 31, a tropical depression developed about 90 mi (145 km) west-southwest of Grand Cayman. The depression strengthened while heading north-northwestward, though a reconnaissance aircraft could not complete its mission on July 31 due to the depression's proximity to Cuba.

Early on August 1, the depression made landfall in western Pinar del Río Province, Cuba. After reaching the southeastern Gulf of Mexico on August 1, warm sea surface temperatures caused the depression to undergo rapid deepening. Later that day, the depression reached tropical storm intensity and was named "Celia", based on a reconnaissance flight observing tropical storm force winds. Satellite imagery indicated that Celia was becoming significantly more organized. At 0000 UTC on August 2, reconnaissance aircraft data indicated that Celia suddenly strengthened into a Category 3 hurricane with sustained winds of 115 mph (185 km/h). However, the storm weakened to a Category 2 hurricane about six hours later. Due to Celia's steady west-northwestward motion across the Gulf of Mexico, the National Hurricane Center marked that the storm "aimed at the Corpus Christi area like a wild beast stalking its prey." Early on August 3, it weakened further to a Category 1 hurricane.

As it turned towards the coast, Celia once again intensified very rapidly once again on August 3, including a  decrease in pressure in only 15 hours, and strengthened quickly right up to landfall along the Texas coast. Celia "maintained strength for an unusually long time" after moving inland, weakening to a tropical storm at 1200 UTC on August 4. Early on the following day, the storm further weakened to a tropical depression. Celia dissipated over western Texas at 1800 UTC on August 5, though the remnants persisted until reaching New Mexico.

Preparations
In the Gulf of Mexico, oil rig crew workers began leaving and headed for land. Residents of Texas coastal towns of High Island, Port Bolivar, and Gilchrist were evacuated further inland. The National Hurricane Center also issued tropical cyclone warnings and watches along the coast of Texas in anticipation of the storm. At 1600 UTC on August 2, a hurricane warning was posted from Palacios to Port Arthur. About six hours later, the warning was extended southward to Rockport. The hurricane warning was expanded further southward to Corpus Christi at 1000 UTC on August 3.

Celia was initially forecast to stay well north of Corpus Christi. However on August 3, the forecast depicted a direct hit on the city. With little warning, many residents did not have enough time to make correct preparations.

Impact

Celia caused 27 fatalities, four in Cuba, eight in Florida and 15 in Texas and left $930 million in damages. Corpus Christi, Texas suffered the worst impact, with at least 85% of all the structures in the city damaged, with 90% of downtown buildings were damaged or destroyed. Additionally, about one-third of houses were severely damaged or flattened.

Cuba and Florida
As a tropical depression, Celia dropped heavy rains over western Cuba, resulting in major flooding. Four people drowned and another man was electrocuted in the water when he tried to retrieve a downed power line. In Escambia County alone, at least 12 lifeguard rescues occurred. Pensacola Beach was closed to the public on September 3, after several rescues on the previous day. Eight people drowned due to adverse water conditions in the Florida Panhandle.

Texas

The most severe damage was in Corpus Christi and Aransas Pass. Throughout the state, 8,950 homes were destroyed and it damaged about 55,650 others. About 252 small businesses, 331 boats, and 310 farm buildings were either damaged or destroyed. Initially, losses were estimated to have reached $434 million. However, due to lower insurance rate of coverage, the original insured losses, $310 million, were tripled, rather than doubled. Thus, the damage toll was revised upward to $930 million in 2011. Damage to crops was slightly more than $8.8 million. In addition, Celia caused 15 fatalities and injured 466 others. The most severe damage occurred in the streaks of damage, not by tornadoes, but a series microbursts and downbursts, most of which occurred in a 15-minute span. Survivors of the storm described the downbursts as "rocket shells" exploding. However, areas between the streaks suffered surprisingly little damage, mainly ornamental due to debris from the homes nearby. Celia dropped heavy rains as it made landfall. However, due to the small size and fast movement of the storm, precipitation was not widespread. At the time of landfall, much of Texas was suffering from a drought. Most areas received .

In Alvin, a small tornado caused the destruction of a few fences and moved a pickup truck. Downed trees caused slight property damage in Amistad Dam, a municipality in Val Verde County. In Artesia Wells, minimal damage occurred to property, reaching only $5,000. The storm damage some homes and 15% of crops in Austwell. Losses in that section of the city reached an estimated $20 million. Minor damage was inflicted on weak structures and shingle or metal roofs in Crystal City. Impact on trees and crops were minimal.

Property damage in Del Rio was about $1 million,  with wind impacts mostly to roofs, mobile homes, signs, boats, windows, trees, and homes under construction, while some businesses and homes were flooded. In addition, two farm houses were deroofed and several outhouses were damaged. Another tornado spawned nearby caused "considerable" damage to the Dilley Civic Center, destroyed machine sheds, unroofed outbuildings, and felled many electrical poles. Throughout Dilley, there was $250,000 in property damage and $350,000 in crop losses. An estimated $50,000  was inflected to property in Eagle Pass. Strong winds in George West caused damage to 90% of trees, some houses, and cotton crops. Damage estimates in the city range from $250,000–$500,000. In Gregory, property losses was about $1 million, while there was about $25,000 in damage to crops. Near Lake Corpus Christi, a man died after he was struck by debris from his house, which was hit by a tornado. Two other people were injured by that tornado and several homes were destroyed. The storm spawned at least 2 other tornadoes, those neither caused any known damage.

Damage in Langtry was very minor, reaching only $600. A tornado in Port O'Connor, destroyed a  boat storage shed, which was owned by Cooperative Weather Observed Bill H. Young. About $707,500 in damage occurred to property, while crop losses reached $425,000. One injury was reported after a person was struck by flying glass. As a result, the entire city lost telephone and electrical services and there was "lots of damage" to trees, 80% of houses, and roofs. Property damage reached about $3.4 million, while there was also $25,000 in crop losses. Property losses in Uvalde reached $100,000, while damage to crops was estimated at $250,000. Additionally, a tornado was spawned in Yoakum, though it apparently caused negligible impact.

Nueces County

The highest tides produced by the storm lashed Nueces County. Because rainfall was relatively light, minor, if any flood damage occurred.

Due to high winds, 85% of the total property damage caused by the storm occurred in Corpus Christi, with 90% of the buildings in downtown either damaged or destroyed. About a third of the houses in the city had serious damage or were destroyed. The University of Corpus Christi, a private institution located on Ward Island, suffered so much damage that it could not afford to rebuild, and it was sold to the State in 1973. Just northeast of the Corpus Christi International Airport, several hundred mobile homes were ripped into small fragments, and the remains were scattered for hundreds of yards. Facilities owned by the Southwestern Bell Corporation (which later became AT&T) suffered $10 million in losses. Another telephone company in the area, General Telephone Company, estimated $700,000 in damage occurred to its business. At the United States Army helicopter repair center in Corpus Christi, there were about $5 million in damage. Around 800–900 family housing units at the Naval Air Station Corpus Christi were considered uninhabitable, indicating $35 million in losses at that location.

Two large Sunoco oil tanks and another owned by Humble Oil burned after possibly being struck by lightning. Approximately $17 million in losses occurred to both companies. Heavy property damage was also reported in rural areas, totaling slightly more than $20 million. At least 75% of the buildings in Port Aransas were damaged. Overall, 74% of property losses associated with Celia were in Nueces County.

Elsewhere
As a result, slight erosion of Louisiana Highway 82 occurred in Cameron Parish between Johnson Bayou and Holly Beach. No damage or fatalities were reported in that state.

Aftermath
Following the storm, then-President of the United States Richard Nixon declared seven counties in Texas as disaster areas – Aransas, Bee, Jim Wells, Live Oak, Nueces, Refugio, and San Patricio – allowing affected residents to be eligible for federal relief. Immediately, then-Governor of Texas Preston Smith sent National Guardsmen to the area to patrol and assist with recovery. About a week after the storm, Governor Smith stated that the most urgent need was financial assistance, and designated the American Red Cross as the official relief agency. The American Red Cross chapters in Colbert and Lauderdale counties in Alabama announced that they were accepting donations to send to southern Texas.

In Corpus Christi, officials applied to pollution control officers for permission to burn  of debris. The University of Corpus Christi (UCC) suffered so much damage that repairs were not affordable. In May 1971, the Texas Legislature passed a bill to establish a Texas A&I campus in Corpus Christi. Two years later, after local residents raised approximately $1.8 million to support the school, the UCC transferred its properties to Texas A&I University (now known as Texas A&M University-Corpus Christi).

In addition, most homeowners insurance policies refused to write insurance for areas considered to be "high risk" along the Texas coast, prompting the state government to form the Texas Catastrophe Property Insurance Association, now known as the Texas Windstorm Insurance Association. Today, TWIA offers coverage to the 14 coastal counties of Texas and a small portion of Harris County near Houston, Texas.

Retirement

Due to the severity of damage caused by the hurricane, the World Meteorological Organization retired the name Celia after the conclusion of the 1970 season. It was replaced with Carmen, which was retired following its first use in 1974.

See also

1970 Atlantic hurricane season
List of Atlantic hurricanes
List of tropical cyclones
Hurricane Harvey

Notes

References

External links

 Satellite loop of Celia
 Storm path

Celia
Celia (1970)
Celia (1970)
Celia
Celia
Celia
History of Corpus Christi, Texas
1970 meteorology
1970 in Mexico
1970 in Florida
1970 in Texas
1970 natural disasters in the United States